Q-dance is a Dutch company that organizes events and festivals that focuses on the harder styles of dance music – mainly Hardstyle, Hardcore, and Hard Trance.  Popular events and festivals organized by Q-dance are Defqon.1 Festival, Qlimax, Qapital, Impaqt, EPIQ, and X-Qlusive. The events of Q-dance are easily identified by the letter “Q” on the event names. The logo of Q-dance is inspired by the knobs on DJ mixers, which if turned 120 degrees to the right creates the letter “Q”.

History

Foundation
Q-dance was founded in 1999 as Qlass Elite by a couple of friends in the northern suburbs of Amsterdam (Landsmeer, the Netherlands). Big EDM label Spinnin' Records was the first to spot the label. The first event created by Qlass Elite was Houseqlassics, an event that played old school house music. After two editions of Houseqlassics, in the year 2000 a few more events were scheduled for the year: 91-92 and Qlimax. A year later, in 2001, the name of the company was changed into Q-dance and a new concept was introduced: Qlubtempo.

With this concept Q-dance introduced a whole new music genre: Hardstyle. This new genre of dance music grew in a few years as one of the most popular dance genres and is still the main type of music played at Q-dance events. And it's the same Q-dance that coined the term Hardstyle around the world on July 4, 2002. In 2002 Q-dance decided to expand the Qlimax event by moving to a bigger venue, Thialf stadion in Heerenveen, the Netherlands. Qlimax grew fast and soon it was clear that the venue at Heerenveen was too small to hold the event. Qlimax was soon held in a bigger venue in the GelreDome in Arnhem, the Netherlands. Until this day the Qlimax events take place each November in the GelreDome.

In 2003 on Bloemendaal beach, the Netherlands, Q-dance built a beach club named Q-beach. In the weekends small parties and talent shows were organized at Q-beach. After two summers Q-dance decided to pull the plug on Q-beach. In 2003 three new concepts were introduced: Defqon.1 Festival, X-Qlusive and the techno concept Teqnology.

Q-dance abroad

In 2004 Q-dance decided to cross borders for the first time. In the German Weeze, on the abandoned RAF-airbase, the first edition of Q-BASE took place. With Q-BASE placed as the international dance event, Q-dance organized an event where visitors from all over Europe came to party. The year 2004 was ended with the first edition of QrimeTime, an event in which visitors were dressed like gangsters and Mafiosi to conclude the year.

In 2005 Belgium became an important country for Q-dance. It was in this year that Q-dance had a permanent venue at Tomorrowland. In 2006 the first Belgian Qlimax was held in Hasselt, Belgium. In 2007 the first Belgian X-Qlusive was organized and a year later the very first Belgian only Q-dance festival was organized: The Qontinent. The events in Belgium are organized by the Q-dance office in Antwerp.

In 2008 it was the turn of Australia to experience Q-dance. Q-dance organized a tour on three big cities in Australia: Sydney, Melbourne and Brisbane. Later that year Q-dance organized two editions of X-Qlusive Showtek in Sydney and Melbourne. In that same year QrimeTime was replaced by Qountdown, a newer concept to end (and begin) the year at the Heineken Music Hall in Amsterdam, the Netherlands.

In September 2009 the first edition of Defqon.1 Festival took place in Sydney, Australia. The festival was in the first year sold out. Also other countries were able to experience the events of Q-dance, in the form of small club tours, countries like: Poland, Brazil, Sweden, France, Italy, Great Britain and Northern Ireland experienced Q-dance.

In 2010 Q-dance celebrated its 10th year of existence in the Amsterdam ArenA, the Netherlands. In its decade anniversary Q-dance recycled materials from past events to relive the Q-dance experience. The Ferris wheel of Defqon.1 2008, the “Flower of Life” of Qlimax 2008 and “The Mask” of Qlimax 2006, among others, were used as decoration. In 2011 Defqon.1 Festival moved from Almere strand to the festival terrain of Biddinghuizen, the Netherlands. With that transition Defqon.1 became an extended festival, where visitors could stay for multiple days in the camping next to the festival terrain. For the weekend visitors there was a pre-party and afterparty. In 2012 Defqon.1 was extended even further. In 2013 Q-dance expanded their concept to South America and the USA. Organizing the first standalone events in the form of The Sound of Q-dance at Santiago, Chile, at Los Angeles, U.S. and Shenzhen, China. Also on November 2 by informations of HardNewsNL will be a new Hardcore event called Nirvana of Noise.

Concepts

Current concepts

Former concepts

Defqon.1 Festival 

Defqon.1 Festival is a multiday festival on the festival terrain of Biddinghuizen, the Netherlands. The first edition of Defqon.1 took place on the Almere Beach in 2003. In a few years time, Defqon.1 grew to be one of the most popular hard dance festivals in the Netherlands. In 2011 the Defqon.1 festival moved to the festival terrain of Biddinghuizen, where visitors could stay camping for the first time. Defqon.1 is organized once per year in the Netherlands. Since 2009 there is as well an Australian version of Defqon.1, which is also a yearly festival held on the Sydney International Regatta Centre.

Q-BASE

Q-BASE was introduced in 2004 as “The international dance festival”. On a former RAF-airbase in Weeze, Germany, thousands of partygoers from all over Europe come together to experience Q-BASE. Apart from the location, Q-BASE uniqueness is that it is a day and night festival. The festival lasts for 14 hours long. At Q-BASE not only hardstyle and hardcore is played, there is also room for new and less common music categories. The final edition of Q-BASE took place on the 8th of September 2018. Q-dance replaced Q-BASE with a new concept called IMPAQT.

Dominator

Held at E3 Strand Eersel since 2005, when there were 20,000 attendees. This event is one of the largest festivals for hardcore techno, with styles such as gabber.

Qlimax

Qlimax is the longest running event of Q-dance. In 2000 the first few editions of Qlimax were organized in the Beursgebouw at Eindhoven, the Netherlands. Since 2003 Qlimax is a yearly returning event at the GelreDome in Arnhem, the Netherlands. The characteristics of a Qlimax event are that the show is organized around a theme, where much attention is given to the show and technology. The predominant music at Qlimax is hardstyle; however, it has become tradition to open the show with a jumpstyle, hard trance, or subground act, and end the show with a hardcore act.

Q-dance hostings
In addition to concepts created by Q-dance, Q-dance is often presented at big events and multi-day festivals in the Netherlands and abroad. Q-dance has a permanent venue on national and international events of Mysteryland. Since 2003 Q-dance has hosted a venue at Mysteryland in the Netherlands as well as in Chile since 2011. In Belgium, Q-dance hosts a permanent venue at Tomorrowland since its first edition in 2005. In 2015 the company started a cooperation for a stage with Electric Love Festival, Austria and Tomorrowland Brasil

Q-dance has hosted a stage at Planet Love, Ireland; Global Gathering, Poland; the Monday Bar Cruise from Sweden to Latvia, Electric Daisy Carnival (EDC), USA and BigCityBeats World Club Dome (WCD), Germany.

References

External links

Q-dance.com

Dance festivals in the Netherlands
Electronic music event management companies